David Tyler Smith (born September 4, 1986) is an American basketball player who last played for Elitzur Eito Ashkelon of the Israeli National League. He played college basketball for Iowa and Tennessee, but his college career came to an end when he was dismissed from the Tennessee program in January 2010. He also earned the Bertelkamp Basketball Scholarship Endowment Fund and the Dane Bradshaw Endowed Athletic Scholarship.

Personal life
He earned tournament MVP honors as a sophomore after leading the Bobcats to the state title. He earned first team all-state honors as a junior after averaging 24 points, nine rebounds and five assists as a junior at Giles County High School. Smith averaged 20 points, 10 rebounds and just over five assists per game at Hargrave Military Academy in Chatham, Va., in 2005-06. He helped lead Hargrave to a 28-2 record while ranking as one of the top prep school teams in the nation. He was a Second team selection on the Street & Smith's 2004 Boys High School all-America team, and was rated a four-star prospect by Rivals.com. He was the 2005 Tennessee Mr. Basketball, averaging 26 points per game as a senior.

Collegiate career

Iowa Hawkeyes (2006–2007)
Smith started 29 of 31 games for the Hawkeyes as a freshman, leading the team in both rebounding and steals. He was the third freshman in school history to lead the Hawkeyes in rebounding.  Additionally, Smith was second on the team in scoring (averaging 14.9 ppg) and assists.  His season resulted in his being named to third-team All-Big Ten as well as to the All-Big Ten Freshman Team.  Smith transferred to Tennessee after his freshman season in order to be closer to his father, who was suffering from lung cancer.

Tennessee Volunteers (2007–2010)

Sophomore Season (2007–08)
He transferred from Iowa and was granted a waiver by the Administrative Review Subcommittee to be eligible to play for the Volunteers at the start of 2007-08 season instead of sitting out a season as would normally be required. He led the Vols in assists, rebounding, and field goal percentage and was third in scoring. He ranked second on the team with 50 steals, increasing his season averages in SEC play, averaging 13.5 points and 7.8 rebounds. In SEC games, ranked 4th  among the league leaders in offensive rebounds, 6th in field goal percentage, 7th in rebounding, 9th in assists, 9th in assists/turnover ratio and averaged 13.5 points per game. He started 35 of UT's 36 games. He was named the SEC Player of the Week after leading the Vols to wins over Auburn and at top-ranked Memphis. Scored in double figures in 31 of 36 games and had six double-doubles. He and teammate Chris Lofton were both named to the All-SEC first team.

Junior Season (2008–09)
He was a team leader and the only Vol to start all 34 games during the season, played primarily at the four spot but also saw time at the three position. He led the Vols in scoring 18 times, assists 16 times and rebounding 10 times. He also led the team with 17.4 points per game (6th in SEC), 3.4 assists per game (8th in the SEC), and a .766 free-throw percentage (8th in the SEC). Ranked 6th in the SEC in assist-to-turnover ratio 1.6, 7th in the SEC with 32.6 minutes played per game and 12th in the SEC in field-goal percentage .439. During the season Smith also had the first triple-double in Tennessee history against UNC Asheville and became the 42nd member of UT's 1,000-point club.  He earned All-Tournament Team honors at the Old Spice Classic, averaging 17.3 points, 4.3 rebounds and 3.0 assists in UT's three games against Siena, Georgetown and Gonzaga. Smith totaled 57 points in three games while leading the Vols to their first SEC Tournament championship game appearance since 1991. He went 10-of-10 at the free-throw line and scored a game-high 21 points vs. Oklahoma State in the NCAA Tournament.

Smith was named first-team All-SEC unanimously.

Senior Season (2009–10)
In his last season at Tennessee he averaged 11.7 points per game and 4.7 rebounds, starting 12 early season games.  On January 1, 2010, Tyler Smith, Cameron Tatum, Brian Williams, and Melvin Goins were arrested for weapons charges and marijuana possession.  Bruce Pearl suspended the four players. Tyler Smith was dismissed from the team, Goins and Tatum were reinstated, while Williams remained on indefinite suspension. Williams was reinstated to the team on Sat., February 6, 2010.

College Stats
Season Totals

Professional career
After his dismissal from Tennessee, Smith signed a two-month contract with Bornova Belediye in the Turkish basketball league in March 2010. He was eligible for the 2010 NBA Draft, but was not selected. Some credit this to his legal problems. On January 24, 2013, he signed a contract with Boulazac Basket Dordogne Club in France.

On December 5, 2018, Smith returned to Israel for a second stint, signing with Elitzur Eito Ashkelon for the rest of the season. In 22 games played for Ashkelon, he averaged 16 points, 8.6 rebounds and 2.5 assists per game, shooting 66 percent from 2-point range.

References

External links
RealGM profile
French League profile
Tennessee Volunteers bio
NBA Draft 2009 Scouting Report

1986 births
Living people
African-American basketball players
American expatriate basketball people in France
American expatriate basketball people in Germany
American expatriate basketball people in Israel
American expatriate basketball people in Turkey
American men's basketball players
Basketball players from Tennessee
Bornova Belediye players
Elitzur Eito Ashkelon players
Hapoel Holon players
Iowa Hawkeyes men's basketball players
Medi Bayreuth players
People from Pulaski, Tennessee
Petkim Spor players
Shooting guards
Small forwards
Tennessee Volunteers basketball players
Hargrave Military Academy alumni
21st-century African-American sportspeople
20th-century African-American people